Kathryn Jean Heddy (born February 4, 1958), also known by her married name Kathy Drum, is an American former competition swimming world champion and four-time Pan American champion.

Heddy grew up in Summit, New Jersey, where she graduated early from Summit High School in January 1976, which allowed her to focus on training during what would have been the second half of her senior year.

Heddy represented the United States at the 1973 World Championships in Belgrade, Yugoslavia. On September 4, she won the bronze medal in the 200-metre individual medley. On September 8, Heddy was part of the silver medal winning 4 × 100 m freestyle relay team. On September 9, she finished 7th in the 100 m freestyle.

Heddy had much success at the 1975 World Championships in Cali, Colombia. On July 22, she won the gold medal in the 200 m medley with a championship record time, 2:19.80, defeating the strong east German swimmers, Ulrike Tauber and Angela Franke. On July 24–25, Heddy won bronze medals in the 400 m medley and 400 m freestyle respectively. On July 26, she was part of the silver medal winning 4 × 100 m freestyle relay team. The American team had taken the world record from the east Germans the previous year and swam 1.25 seconds below that mark in the final, but still lost to the east Germans who took back the world record and won the gold. On July 27, Heddy finished fourth in the 100 m freestyle, a mere 1/100 s from the bronze. She had to settle for four medals in total, when summing up her 1975 world championship.

Later that year, Heddy was unstoppable at the Pan American Games in Mexico City, where she won four gold medals: the 200 m medley, the 400 m medley, the 400 m freestyle and as part of the American 4 × 100 m freestyle relay team.

Heddy also participated at the 1976 Summer Olympics in Montreal, Quebec, where she finished fifth in the 400-metre freestyle on July 20.

See also
 List of World Aquatics Championships medalists in swimming (women)
 World record progression 4 × 100 metres freestyle relay

References

1958 births
Living people
American female freestyle swimmers
World record setters in swimming
Olympic swimmers of the United States
Sportspeople from Summit, New Jersey
Sportspeople from Syracuse, New York
Summit High School (New Jersey) alumni
Swimmers at the 1975 Pan American Games
Swimmers at the 1976 Summer Olympics
World Aquatics Championships medalists in swimming
Pan American Games gold medalists for the United States
Pan American Games medalists in swimming
Medalists at the 1975 Pan American Games
21st-century American women